The regions of Niger are subdivided into 63 departments. Before the devolution program on 1999–2005, these departments  were styled arrondissements.  Confusingly, the next level up (regions) had, before 2002-2005 been styled departments. Prior to a revision in 2011, there had been 36 departments. A draft law in August 2011 would expand that number to 63.
 Until 2010, arrondissements remained a proposed subdivision of departments, though none were used.  The decentralisation process, begun in the 1995-1999 period replaced appointed Prefects at Departmental or Arrondissement level with elected councils, first elected in 1999.  These were the first local elections held in the history of Niger.  Officials elected at commune level are then selected as representatives at Departmental, regional, and National level councils and administration.  The Ministry of Decentralisation was created to oversee this task, and to create a national consultative council of local officials.

On 1 August 2011, the National Assembly of Niger approved a draft law which would dramatically expand the number of departments to 63.  The law will create 27 new departments centered on the former appointed sub departmental Postes Administratifs.

The 27 new department capitals will be: Aderbissanat, Iférouane, Ingall, Bosso, Goudoumaria, N'Gourti, Dioundiou, Falmèye, Tibiri, Bermo, Gazaoua, Bagaroua, Tassara, Tillia, Abala, Ayérou, Ballayara, Bankilaré, Banibangou, Gothèye, Torodi, Belbédji, Damagaram Takaya, Dungass, Takiéta, Tesker. 
 
The 63 departments are broken down into communes.  As of 2006 there were 265 communes, including communes urbaines (urban communes: centred in or as subdivisions of cities of over 10000), communes rurales (rural communes) centred in cities of under 10,000 and/or sparsely populated areas, and a variety of traditional (clan or tribal) bodies amongst semi-nomadic populations.  The former postes administratifs (administrative posts) for largely uninhabited desert areas or military zones were incorporated as full departments with borders to be determined.

The 36 pre-2011 departments are listed below, by region.

Agadez Region

 Arlit Department (Arlit)
 Bilma Department (Bilma)
 Tchirozerine Department (Tchirozerine)

Diffa Region

 Diffa Department (Diffa)
 Maine-soroa Department (Maine-soroa)
 N'guigmi Department (N'guigmi)

Dosso Region

 Boboye Department (Boboye)
 Dogondoutchi Department (Dogondoutchi)
 Dosso Department (Dosso)
 Gaya Department (Gaya)
 Loga Department (Loga)

Maradi Region

 Aguie Department (Aguie)
 Dakoro Department (Dakoro)
 Guidan Roumdji Department (Guidan Roumdji)
 Madarounfa Department (Madarounfa)
 Mayahi Department (Mayahi)
 Tessaoua Department (Tessaoua)

Tahoua Region

 Abalak Department (Abalak)
 Bkonni Department (Bkonni)
 Bouza Department (Bouza)
 Illela Department (Illela)
 Keita Department (Keita)
 Madaoua Department (Madaoua)
 Tahoua Department (Tahoua)
 Tchin-Tabaraden Department (Tchin-Tabaraden)

Tillabéri Region

 Filingue Department (Filingue)
 Kollo Department (Kollo)
 Ouallam Department (Ouallam)
 Say Department (Say)
 Téra Department (Téra)
 Tillabéri Department (Tillabéri)

Post-2011 division departments 
 Abala	
 Ayérou	
 Balléyara	
 Banibangou	
 Bankilaré	
 Filingué	
 Gothèye	
 Kollo	kollo
 Ouallam	
 Say	
 Téra	
 Tillabéri	
 Torodi

Zinder Region

 Goure Department (Goure)
 Magaria Department (Magaria)
 Matameye Department (Zinder)
 Mirriah Department (Mirriah)
 Tanout Department (Tanout)

See also
 Communes of Niger
 Geography of Niger

References

External links
Statoids

 
Subdivisions of Niger
Niger, Departments
Niger 2
Departments, Niger
Niger geography-related lists